Herbert Thalhammer (12 July 1955 – 6 February 2022) was an Austrian politician.

He died on 6 February 2022, at the age of 66.

References

1955 births
2022 deaths
20th-century Austrian politicians
The Greens – The Green Alternative politicians
People from Gmunden District